The Memorial Union (MU) is the student activity center at Oregon State University in Corvallis, Oregon, United States.  It contains a ballroom, cafeteria, bowling alley, shops, and study areas. It was designed by Oregon Agricultural College (a predecessor of OSU) graduate Lee Arden Thomas.

History
The idea to build the Memorial Union building originally came from veterans Warren Daigh and Tony Schille, Oregon State students. Their vision was that the building would be in commemoration of their fellow soldiers who had been killed in the line of duty during WWI.  Groundbreaking occurred March 3, 1926 Construction was funded by contributions from past and present students. The building was officially dedicated by Judge James K. Weatherford, chair of the OAC Board of Regents.  Thomas, the building's architect, was an alumnus based in Portland. Memorial Union opened to the public on June 1, 1928. It is of Neoclassical design, with an exterior built mainly with red-colored bricks with white granite accents including a dome in the center. The MU is the smallest union building in the Pac-12, and the oldest.

The building is one of the few OSU buildings of that era not attributed to John Bennes, and has been described as "one of the finest examples of neoclassic architecture in Oregon." It has been "known to generations of Oregon Staters as simply the MU", and "was built in 1927-28 as a monument to those who have given their lives in defense of the nation, as well as a center for student life on campus." 

The building was funded entirely with private donations and gifts at a cost of around $750,000, and a $3 per term assessment Oregon State students implemented beginning in January 1922. It was dedicated on June 1, 1929. The east and west wings (restaurant and commons) are later additions, having been added in 1960 and extensively renovated in the 1990s; the MU was owned by the Memorial Union Corporation until 1965 when it transferred the facility to the State Board of Higher Education.

References 

1928 establishments in Oregon
Oregon State University buildings
Student activity centers in the United States